Daniel Mazziotta (born September 20, 1988) is an American professional golfer who played on PGA Tour Latinoamérica and Web.com Tour.

Mazziotta had a successful college career at Florida Gulf Coast University. He graduated in 2011 with the second best scoring average in the program. He was selected to the Atlantic Sun All-Conference first team in successive years in 2010 and 2011.

Turning pro in 2011, Mazziotta initially played his golf on the NGA Pro Golf Tour and the West Florida Golf Tour achieving a combined total of six victories, one on the NGA Pro Golf Tour and five on the West Florida Golf Tour, before earning his PGA Tour Latinoamérica playing rights for the 2014 season.

Mazziotta's first win on PGA Tour Latinoamérica came at the 2014 Mundo Maya Open in just his fourth start on the tour.

Professional wins (9)

PGA Tour Latinoamérica wins (2)

NGA Hooters Tour wins (1)
 2012 Winter Series

West Florida Golf Tour wins (5)
 5 events on the West Florida Golf Tour

Other wins (1)
2022 Wisconsin State Open

References

External links
 
 

American male golfers
PGA Tour Latinoamérica golfers
Golfers from Florida
Sportspeople from Fort Myers, Florida
1988 births
Living people